The medulla of ovary (or Zona vasculosa of Waldeyer) is a highly vascular stroma in the center of the ovary.  It forms from embryonic mesenchyme and contains blood vessels, lymphatic vessels, and nerves.

This stroma forms the tissue of the hilum by which the ovarian ligament is attached, and through which the blood vessels enter: it does not contain any ovarian follicles.

References

External links
  - "Female Reproductive System: ovary, medulla and cortex"
 

Mammal female reproductive system